Andrés Camilo Ardila Ordoñez (born 2 June 1999) is a Colombian cyclist, who currently rides for UCI ProTeam .

Major results

2017
 National Junior Road Championships
2nd Road race
2nd Time trial
2018
 1st Stage 5 Vuelta al Tolima
 5th Overall Vuelta de la Juventud de Colombia
2019
 1st  Overall Giro Ciclistico d'Italia
1st  Young rider classification
1st Stages 4 & 5
 3rd Overall Vuelta de la Juventud de Colombia
1st Stages 3 & 5
2021
 3rd Time trial, National Road Championships

References

External links

1999 births
Living people
People from Tolima Department
Colombian male cyclists
21st-century Colombian people